Dynamic Earth (originally known as Our Dynamic Earth) is a not-for-profit visitor attraction and science centre in Edinburgh and is Scotland's largest interactive visitor attraction. It is located in the Holyrood area, beside the Scottish Parliament building and at the foot of Salisbury Crags. It is a registered charity under Scottish law and is owned as The Dynamic Earth Charitable Trust. The centre was opened by Queen Elizabeth II in 1999.

The project is located close to where renowned Scottish geologist James Hutton lived and worked in the city in the 18th century. The Dynamic Earth Trust says its aim is: "to consistently be the most fun place to play, learn and work.” A permanent visitor attraction which presents the story of the planet - how it was created; how it continues to evolve, the prospects for mankind and the effect of hazards both natural and manmade."

History
The new exhibition was funded by the Millennium Commission in association with The Heritage Lottery Fund and the Scottish Government as part of an urban regeneration project for former industrial land in the Holyrood area. The location was previously on a site which was latterly a gas-works and part of the old Holyrood Brewery. The brewers Scottish & Newcastle donated the site for public use in 1988 however the brewery did not vacate the site until the mid-1990s.

The new exhibition cost around £34 million to design and construct (out of a budget of £150 million for the entire area) and was the first major United Kingdom millennium attraction to open. Other exhibitions funded by the Millennium Commission include the Glasgow Science Centre, the Falkirk Wheel and the Millennium Dome in London. The centre was officially opened by Queen Elizabeth II in 1999.

Design

The building's structure consists of a steel mast-supported membrane stretched over a steel skeleton. It was designed by architects Michael Hopkins and Partners. The design incorporates the original wall that formed the outer perimeter of the Abbey Brewery ale stores that were formerly on the site.

The building was intended to show a relationship between nature and artifice and comprises three features: the fabric roof and its structure which is set on a terrace housing a two-storey exhibition space and the entrance forecourt. The large entrance area was designed to have the feel of an outdoor area whilst being completely enclosed. At the front of the museum there is a large amphitheatre which is used for outdoor events and gathering points for tours of the facility.

Features

The facility is designed as an immersive experience with a high level of interactivity. Permanent features of the museum include a real Iceberg, an earthquake experience and the Deep Time Machine which allows visitors to travel through the creation of our planet through multimedia and 4D techniques.

The venue also is home to a digital 360° cinema called the ShowDome, to tell the story of planet Earth through fun and educational films. This feature operates with state-of-the-art Uniview software which transforms cinema into a fully interactive Planetarium and space experience. In an interview with the Press & Journal, chief executive of Dynamic Earth John Simpson, said: “The new equipment will offer visitors an amazing experience within our ShowDome and will inspire even more children and families about Earth and space sciences with an in-house planetarium and a mobile planetarium to reach families all over Scotland.”

As well as interactive exhibitions, the site also features the Food Chain Cafe for refreshments and the Natural Selection Gift Shop. The building is designed with full accessibility and has wheelchair access, internal lifts, disabled toilet facilities on both sides of the building, which include handle rails and wide door access. Audio guides are also available and English transcripts are available for those with visual or hearing impairments.

Reception
Dynamic Earth is a 5 star world-class visitor attraction, which is determined by VisitScotland (formerly the Scottish Tourist Board).

The building itself has also won a 2001 RIBA Regional Award from the Royal Institute of British Architects and a Civic Trust Award in 2000.

Visitor Numbers
As with many other Science Centers and Exhibitions constructed around the time including the Millennium Experience in London and The Big Idea in Irvine, initial visitor numbers proved to be overly-optimistic. The Millennium Experience in London received roughly half of their expected visitors and was deemed a failure, whilst The Big Idea closed after only three years in operation after failing to cover operating costs. In 2007, Dynamic Earth submitted that, since opening, the attraction has received over 3 million visitors.  In 2006 it received 202,500 visitors of which 46,500 were visits by school parties. In order to increase revenue, Dynamic Earth developed three new income sources to complement their visitor attraction in the mid-2000s. These included providing corporate hospitality, hosting meetings and events (including weddings) and educational experiences to allow school trips and group visits from around the country.

See also
 Glasgow Science Centre - Science Centre in Glasgow, Scotland.
 Aberdeen Science Centre - Science Centre in Aberdeen, Scotland.
 Dundee Science Centre - Science Centre in Dundee, Scotland.
 Millennium Dome - Exhibition Centre in London, England.
 The Big Idea - Science Centre in Irvine, North Ayrshire.
 Millennium Commission - United Kingdom public body.

References

External links
Dynamic Earth website
VisitScotland - Dynamic Earth

Buildings and structures completed in 1999
Buildings and structures in Edinburgh
Education in Edinburgh
Buildings and structures celebrating the third millennium
Museums in Edinburgh
Geology museums in Scotland
1999 establishments in Scotland
Science centers in Scotland
Geology of Scotland
Science and technology in Edinburgh
Buildings by Hopkins Architects
Charities based in Scotland